Mburu is a surname of Kenyan origin. Notable people with the surname include:

Andrew Kibe Mburu, Kenyan politician for the United Democratic Forum Party
Beth Mburu-Bowie (born 1987), English musician
Kenneth Mburu Mungara (born 1973), Kenyan marathon runner and four-time Toronto Waterfront Marathon champion
Stanley Waithaka Mburu (born 2000), Kenyan long-distance runner

Kenyan names
Surnames of Kenyan origin